Robert Hichens may refer to:

Robert Hichens (writer) (1864–1950), English writer
Robert Hichens (sailor) (1882–1940), quartermaster on the RMS Titanic
Robert Peverell Hichens (1909–1943), RNVR officer in the Second World War